Woodland Creek is a stream in Thurston County in the U.S. state of Washington. It is a tributary to Henderson Inlet.

Woodland Creek took its name from Woodland, Washington, an early variant name of the city of Lacey, which in turn was named after Isaac Wood, an early settler.

References

Rivers of Thurston County, Washington
Rivers of Washington (state)